is a passenger railway station located in the town of Sakawa, Takaoka District, Kōchi Prefecture, Japan. It is operated by JR Shikoku and has the station number "K12".

Lines

Layout
The station consists of a side platform and an island platform serving three tracks. A station building, which is  unstaffed, serves as a waiting room. A footbridge connects to the island platform. A siding juts partially into the other side of the side platform.

Adjacent stations

|-

History
At this time the station was operated by Japanese Government Railways, later becoming Japanese National Railways (JNR). With the privatization of JNR on 1 April 1987, control of the station passed to JR Shikoku.

The station became unstaffed on 1 September 2010 when JR Shikoku closed its ticket counter. In 2016, JR Shikoku handed the station building over to the Sakawa Town authorities who renovated it.

Surrounding area
Kochi Prefectural Sagawa High School
Sagawa Municipal Sagawa Elementary School

See also
 List of Railway Stations in Japan

References

External links

 JR Shikoku timetable

Railway stations in Kōchi Prefecture
Railway stations in Japan opened in 1924
Sakawa, Kōchi